Revenant Mountain is a  mountain summit located in southwestern Alberta, Canada. The peak is located in the Palliser Range. It was named in 1963 to follow the "ghost like" theme of other land features in the area include Apparition Mountain and Ghost River.

See also
 Geography of Alberta

References

Three-thousanders of Alberta
Mountains of Banff National Park
Alberta's Rockies